Mock Orange is an American indie rock band from Evansville, Indiana, United States. They debuted in 1998 during a growing emo and punk musical climate. Though they never reached the commercial success of some of their contemporaries, they are widely respected as a prolific group with a unique sound.

Overview
Mock Orange first introduced their sound in 1998 with “Nines & Sixes.” The record immediately established Mock Orange on the national scene and received critical acclaim in the press along with a spot on the CMJ Top 60 college radio charts. In 2000, the band followed up with “The Record Play.” Produced by Mark Trombino (Pinback, Jimmy Eat World), the record continued to earn Mock Orange a legion of fans.

Despite this early success, challenges lay ahead for the band. In 2002, just after the release of the "First EP", the band's label, Dead Droid Records, was sued by George Lucas for copyright infringement. The suit resulted in the collapse of the label, and left Mock Orange searching for a new home. The EP, however, was a progression, yielding a sound that infused more diverse rhythms, subtle lyrics and angular guitars. The result was natural for a band who cut its teeth on The Flaming Lips’ “Soft Bulletin” and Pavement's “Slanted and Enchanted.”

Poised to explore this new direction, Mock Orange returned to the studio, this time with producer J. Robbins (Dismemberment Plan, The Promise Ring), and delivered Mind is Not Brain. The record wowed critics, causing Alternative Press to call it the "closest to a perfect album we've heard in a long time." The band also earned loyal new fans as it took to the road with relentless touring over three continents, performing alongside bands like Rogue Wave, Ted Leo, and Minus the Bear. Live appearances on MTV2 and songs on shows like CSI Miami, MTV's Real World and ESPN would follow.
  
On September 9, 2008, Wednesday Records released Mock Orange's Captain Love. The record was recorded over the better part of a year in Nashville, Tennessee with producer Jeremy Ferguson (Be Your Own Pet, Josh Rouse). Punctuated by the engaging artwork of Kathleen Lolley (My Morning Jacket's Z), the record picks up where Mind Is Not Brain left off and proves to be Mock Orange's most sophisticated, ambitious and affecting release to date.

Mock Orange have also developed a strong following in Japan, touring the country five times with their Japanese labelmates The Band Apart and releasing a split EP titled Daniels EP. 2006 also saw the band making their European debut, touring in Germany, Spain, France and Switzerland. The UK leg of the tour was cancelled after the band's van was broken into in Spain.

2011 saw the release of their latest full-length album, Disguised As Ghosts, on Wednesday Records. Slightly less funky than Captain Love, it still follows along the acoustic-strewn pop path with thoughtful arrangements and excellent production. The album was recorded by bassist Zach Grace with Jeremy Ferguson returning to help produce. The album has been released on both CD and Vinyl.

In 2016, the band signed with Topshelf Records (Braid, The Jazz June) to release their follow-up to "Disguised As Ghosts". According to Mock Orange's Twitter account, Alan Douches was recruited to master the album in late March. Said to be a melding of their two conflicting past sounds, Put The Kid On The Sleepy Horse has a May 20, 2016 release date.

Band members
Current members
 Ryan Grisham - guitar, vocals (1993-present)
 Heath Metzger - drums (1993-present)
 Zach Grace - bass, backing vocals (2002–present)
 Matt McGuyer - guitar, backing vocals (2021-present)

Former members
 Joe Asher - guitar, backing vocals (1993–2021)
 Brandon Chappell – bass (1993–2002)

Discography

Albums 
Open Sunday (1995, Minus 7)
Mock Orange (1997, Minus 7)
Nines & Sixes (1998, Lobster Records)
The Record Play (2000, Lobster Records)
Mind is Not Brain (2004, Silverthree)
Captain Love (2008, Wednesday Records)
Disguised as Ghosts (2011, Wednesday Records)
Put the Kid On the Sleepy Horse (2016, Topshelf Records)

Live 
Live in Brooklyn (2009, Wednesday Records)

EPs 
The First EP (2002, Dead Droid Records)
Daniels EP (2006, Asian Gothic)
Daniels EP 2 (2016, Asian Gothic)
The Bridge EP (2020, Bedfire Records)

Singles 
Mock Orange/The Borgo Pass (1999, Northern Lights)

Compilations 
Lobster Records: Greetings (2001, Lobster Records)
Firework Anatomy (2001, Engineer Records)
Not One Light Red: A Desert Extended (2002, Sunset Alliance)
Rock Music: A Tribute to Weezer (2002, Dead Droid Records)
Gems (2006, Lobster Records)
Play (2007, Desoto Records)

Soundtracks
Tony Hawk's Gigantic SkatePark Tour 2002 - "We Work", "Growing Crooked" 2002
Scott Baio Is 45...and Single -"Mind is not Brain", "Old Man", "Oh My God", and "Birds"
Bella - Metanoia Films - "East Side Song" appears in the trailer of the movie 2006
CSI: Miami - "All You Have", "Drinking Song" and "We Work"
LEVI's BMX Clip of the Week -"Lila" and "Smile On
Maloof Money Cup, NBC -"Song in D" and "Supergang"
16 and Pregnant MTV - "I Keep Saying So Long" 2009
Raising The Bar TNT - "Captain Love" 2009
Greek, ABC Family -"Smile On"
MTV's Made - "Drinking Song"
Vh1's Free Radio - "Smile On"
Viva La Bam - Five Songs
MTV's College Life - Seven Songs
MTV's Maui Fever - Six Songs
MTV's There and Back - Three Songs
MTV's Real World
Fox Sports
ESPN2
Past Life Warner Bros.
The Vicious Kind Movie trailer-"Song in D" 72nd Street Productions

Contests
The Mt. Dew Break Out Contest MTV2 - performed live, placed second
International Songwriting Competition - placed first in Rock category

References

External links
Mock Orange Official Website
Facebook page

Indie rock musical groups from Indiana
People from Newburgh, Indiana
Topshelf Records artists